Frank S. Sawyer (January 30, 1952 – April 6, 2015) was a member of the Ohio House of Representatives.

References

1950s births
Members of the Ohio House of Representatives
2015 deaths